This is a list of all lighthouses in the U.S. state of Georgia as identified by the United States Coast Guard. There are three active lights in the state including one maintained as a private aid; four are standing but inactive, and one has been replaced by an automated skeleton tower, and one destroyed by a ship collision. One tower, the second Sapelo Island Light, was moved to Michigan; the first tower on the site is still standing and was relit in 1998.

The earliest lighthouse in the state was erected in 1736; the oldest surviving tower is the Sapelo Island Light, though the present Tybee Island Light, erected in 1867, incorporates the base of its 1773 predecessor. The last lighthouse in the state, the Savannah Light, was constructed in 1964.

The lighthouses on Cumberland Island, Sapelo Island, and St. Simons Island are on the National Register of Historic Places.  The Old Harbor Light in Savannah is a contributing property to a National Historic Landmark district.

If not otherwise noted, focal height and coordinates are taken from the United States Coast Guard Light List, while location and dates of activation, automation, and deactivation are taken from the United States Coast Guard Historical information site for lighthouses.

Notes 
A. Sapelo Island Light also served as a rear range light from 1856 to 1898.
B. The second Sapelo Island Light was a steel tower built in 1905, it was later re-erected at South Fox Island Light (Michigan) in 1933. The original brick 1820 tower was reactivated in 1998 and still stands today.
C. Sapelo Island Light originally had a Fourth-order Fresnel lens but it has since been replaced by an unknown modern optic.
D. There isn't any evidence that this is still used for navigational purposes. The light remains lit as a decorate piece.
E. Replaced with a skeleton tower at an unknown date.

References 

Georgia (U.S. state)
 
Lighthouses
Lighthouses